Varina Tjon-A-Ten (born 29 November 1952 in Paramaribo, Suriname) is a Dutch politician who was a member of the House of Representatives for the Dutch Labour Party (PvdA) from 2003 to 2006.

Her paternal grandfather came from mainland China to Suriname, but she refers herself to as moksi watra (mixed blood): one of her great-grandmothers was a Brahmin Indian from British Guiana who married a Scot, and she also has Dutch and Jewish ancestry. Her family arrived in Rotterdam in 1964.

See also
 European politicians of Chinese descent

Sources

1952 births
Dutch Jews
Dutch people of Chinese descent
Dutch people of Indian descent
Dutch people of Guyanese descent
Dutch people of Scottish descent
Dutch women in politics
Labour Party (Netherlands) politicians
Living people
Members of the House of Representatives (Netherlands)
People from Paramaribo
Dutch politicians of Chinese descent
Surinamese emigrants to the Netherlands
Surinamese people of Chinese descent
Surinamese people of Guyanese descent
Surinamese people of Indian descent
Surinamese people of Jewish descent
Surinamese people of Scottish descent